19th CFCA Awards
December 28, 2006

Best Film: 
 The Departed 

The 19th Chicago Film Critics Association Awards, given by the CFCA on December 28, 2006 honored the best in film for 2006.

Winners and nominees

Best Actor
Forest Whitaker – The Last King of Scotland
 Leonardo DiCaprio – The Departed
 Ryan Gosling – Half Nelson
 Peter O'Toole – Venus
 Will Smith – The Pursuit of Happyness

Best Actress
Helen Mirren – The Queen
 Penélope Cruz – Volver
 Judi Dench – Notes on a Scandal
 Maggie Gyllenhaal – Sherrybaby
 Meryl Streep – The Devil Wears Prada
 Kate Winslet – Little Children

Best Cinematography
Children of Men – Emmanuel Lubezki Babel – Rodrigo Prieto
 The Departed – Michael Ballhaus
 The Fountain – Matthew Libatique
 Letters from Iwo Jima – Tom Stern

Best DirectorMartin Scorsese – The Departed
 Clint Eastwood – Letters from Iwo Jima
 Stephen Frears – The Queen
 Alejandro González Iñárritu – Babel
 Paul Greengrass – United 93

Best Documentary Film
An Inconvenient Truth
 Deliver Us from Evil
 Jesus Camp
 Shut Up & Sing
 Wordplay

Best Film
The Departed
 Babel
 Little Miss Sunshine
 The Queen
 United 93

Best Foreign Language Film
Letters from Iwo Jima, United States Apocalypto, United States
 Pan's Labyrinth (El laberinto del fauno), Mexico/Spain/United States
 Tsotsi, South Africa
 Volver, Spain

Best Original ScoreThe Fountain – Clint Mansell Babel – Gustavo Santaolalla
 Letters from Iwo Jima – Kyle Eastwood and Michael Stevens
 Notes on a Scandal – Philip Glass
 The Queen – Alexandre Desplat

Best Screenplay – AdaptedThe Departed – William Monahan Little Children – Todd Field and Tom Perrotta
 Notes on a Scandal – Patrick Marber
 A Prairie Home Companion – Garrison Keillor
 Thank You for Smoking – Jason Reitman

Best Screenplay – OriginalThe Queen – Peter Morgan Babel – Guillermo Arriaga
 Letters from Iwo Jima – Iris Yamashita
 Little Miss Sunshine – Michael Arndt
 United 93 – Paul Greengrass

Best Supporting Actor Jackie Earle Haley – Little Children
 Ben Affleck – Hollywoodland
 Eddie Murphy – Dreamgirls
 Jack Nicholson – The Departed
 Brad Pitt – Babel
 Michael Sheen – The Queen

Best Supporting Actress
Rinko Kikuchi – Babel
 Adriana Barraza – Babel
 Cate Blanchett – Notes on a Scandal
 Abigail Breslin – Little Miss Sunshine
 Toni Collette – Little Miss Sunshine
 Jennifer Hudson – Dreamgirls

Most Promising Performer
Sacha Baron Cohen – Borat: Cultural Learnings of America for Make Benefit Glorious Nation of Kazakhstan and Talladega Nights: The Ballad of Ricky Bobby Ivana Baquero – Pan's Labyrinth (El laberinto del fauno)
 Shareeka Epps – Half Nelson
 Rinko Kikuchi – Babel
 Keke Palmer – Akeelah and the Bee

Most Promising FilmmakerRian Johnson – Brick Jonathan Dayton and Valerie Faris – Little Miss Sunshine Gil Kenan – Monster House James McTeigue – V for Vendetta Jason Reitman – Thank You for Smoking''

References
 http://moviecitynews.com/archived/awards/2007/critic_awards/chicago.html

 2006
2006 film awards